Danièle Vidal (born 27 June 1952) is a French singer. She is best known in Japan for her career in the early 1970s.

Biography
Vidal was born in Morocco when it was a French colony. She debuted in 1969 at age seventeen with the record "Aime ceux qui t'aiment", a French-language cover of Edita Piekha's Russian song "Nash sosed" with different lyrics. "Aime ceux qui t'aiment" was released as "Tenshi no Rakugaki" in Japan.

Vidal released songs in French and Japanese. In the early 1970s she moved to Japan and lived there for several years. In 1980 Vidal married musician Shibata (Japanese name: 柴田功) of the Japanese group sounds band Chaco & Hell's Angel. They had one son and divorced. Vidal now lives in France.

Selected discography
 "Aime ceux qui t'aiment" / "Tenshi no Rakugaki" (Japanese title: 天使のらくがき)
 "Les Champs-Elysées"
 "Ciao bella ciao"
 "Pinocchio"
Catherine (Japanese title: カトリーヌ)

References

External links
Daniele Vidal - partial discography

1952 births
Living people
French women singers
French-language singers
French expatriates in Japan